"Ironic" is a song by Canadian singer Alanis Morissette. It was released in February 1996 as the third single from her third studio album, Jagged Little Pill (1995). It was written by Morissette and Glen Ballard, and was produced by him. "Ironic" is a song written in the key of B major, and includes a moderate tempo of eighty-five beats per minute. The lyrics present several situations that are described as "ironic"; this has led to debate as to whether any of these actually match the accepted meaning of irony.

For six weeks, the track topped the Canadian RPM Top Singles chart. It also reached the top five in Australia, New Zealand, and Norway. In the United States, the song reached number four on April 13, 1996, and since then it has been her highest-charting single on the Billboard Hot 100. "Ironic" was certified gold by the Recording Industry Association of America (RIAA). The song won the Juno Award for Single of the Year, and received two Grammy Award nominations in 1997, for Record of the Year and Best Short Form Music Video. French director Stéphane Sednaoui filmed the music video. In it, Morissette drives through a winter landscape, and she plays multiple roles as her passengers. MTV nominated the music video for six MTV Video Music Awards in 1996, winning three of them. The music video was listed on VH1's "Greatest Music Videos" list and was parodied by DBA Flip, Allison Rheaume, Rusty and "Weird Al" Yankovic.

In September 2001, following the September 11 attacks, "Ironic" was labeled inappropriate due to its lyrics by American mass media company Clear Channel Communications. The song was included on the set list of Morissette's Jagged Little Pill World Tour (1995), and her compilation albums MTV Unplugged (1999), The Collection (2005), among others. The song was covered by Mexican duet Jesse & Joy for their album Esta Es Mi Vida Sesiones (2007), and by American band Four Year Strong for their cover album Explains It All (2009).

Writing and composition

"Ironic" was written by Alanis Morissette and Glen Ballard, and produced by the latter for her third studio album, Jagged Little Pill (1995). In an interview with Christopher Walsh of Billboard, Ballard explained how he and Morissette met, and how "Ironic" was written. He commented: "I'm telling you, within 15 minutes we were at it—just writing. 'Ironic' was the third song we wrote. Oh God, we were just having fun. I thought 'I don't know what this is—what genre it is—who knows? It's just good". According to the sheet music published at Musicnotes.com, it is a song set in the time signature of common time, composed in a moderate tempo of eighty-five beats per minute. It is set in the key of B major with Morissette's vocal range from the tone of E5 to B5, and "Ironic" chord progression starts with the sequence of Emaj7–F♯6–Emaj7–F♯6, before changing to F♯–Badd9–F♯–G♯m7 in the chorus.

Linguistic dispute
The song's usage of the word ironic attracted media attention; according to Jon Pareles of The New York Times, it gives a distinct "unironic" sense in its implications.  According to the Oxford English Dictionary, irony is "a state of affairs or an event that seems deliberately contrary to what was or might be expected; an outcome cruelly, humorously, or strangely at odds with assumptions or expectations". Thus, lyrics such as "It's a free ride when you've already paid" and "A traffic jam when you're already late" are not ironic.

Morissette said: "For me the great debate on whether what I was saying in 'Ironic' was ironic wasn't a traumatic debate. I'd always embraced the fact that every once in a while I'd be the malapropism queen. And when Glen and I were writing it, we definitely were not doggedly making sure that everything was technically ironic." In 2014, Michael Reid Roberts wrote a defense of the song for Salon, saying that it cites situational ironies: the "state of affairs or event[s] that seems deliberately contrary to what one expects and is often wryly amusing as a result". Michael Stevens of the YouTube channel Vsauce devoted time to the discussion of irony in the 2014 episode "Dord". In this video, Stevens considers the difference between the typically cited "situational" irony, versus "dramatic" irony. According to him, the irony of the song may not necessarily be in the situations themselves, but rather in the dramatic irony – when someone is unaware of the significance of the event while others are: the situations aren't ironic themselves, but life itself is ironic.

Comedian Ed Byrne performed a skit in which he jokingly attacked the song for its lack of ironies: "The only ironic thing about that song is it's called 'Ironic' and it's written by a woman who doesn't know what irony is. That's quite ironic." Satirists Berger and Wyse parodied the song in one segment of their cartoon strip The Pitchers. In that episode, a superhero named "Irony Man" compared his superpowers to lyrics from Morissette's song, causing his cohorts to rename him "The Man from Alanis". In December 2009, the comedy website CollegeHumor released a spoof video of the song called "Actually Ironic", featuring actress Sarah Natochenny, in which Patrick Cassels amended the lyrics in a form that would be appropriately ironic. For example, "it's like rain on your wedding day, to the Egyptian sun god Ra." The CollegeHumor spoof was similarly replicated in July 2013 with a song called, "It's Finally Ironic" by sisters Rachael and Eliza Hurwitz, from New York City, who published their version on YouTube. The sisters adjusted the lyrics to reflect irony (e.g., "it's a black fly in your chardonnay, that was specifically purchased to repel black flies") and sing the line "We fixed it for you, Alanis. You're welcome." throughout their video. In his 2014 song "Word Crimes", "Weird Al" Yankovic references Morissette's lyrics by singing "Irony is not coincidence", and the music video for the song shows a fire truck burning (depicted as "Irony") compared with rain during a wedding (which is described as "Weather"). Morissette herself poked fun at her grammar mistakes during a 2013 performance of "Semicolon" with The Lonely Island on Jimmy Kimmel Live!. In it, Morissette cut off their song to explain that their use of hashtag rap to demonstrate the function of a semicolon is incorrect, to which they respond that her critiquing their grammar is "ironic". Morissette further poked fun at herself in a 2015 performance of an updated version "Ironic" on The Late Late Show with James Corden, in which she added the line "It’s singing 'Ironic', when there are no ironies" to the song.

Reception

Critical response
Jaime Gill from Dot Music commented on the original version of "Ironic", on his review of Jagged Little Pill Acoustic (2005), that "[Jagged Little Pill] gave us pop's greatest parlour game, with spot the genuine irony in 'Ironic'" and calling the song "pretty" and "catchy". Additionally, he noted that the acoustic version “actually sounds more relaxed and engaging without the hoary loud guitars of the original". Even though Stephen Thomas Erlewine of AllMusic marked the track as one of the "All Media Guide track pick" of the album, in a separate review, from the same website, the CD single release was rated with two-and-a-half out of five stars. Pareles noted that in verses of "Ironic", and another song from the album ("Mary Jane"), "it's easy to envision Morissette on the stage of a club, singing wry couplets backed by acoustic guitar". He also commented in another article he wrote, that the song was actually "unironic". British magazine Music Week rated it four out of five, noting that it "builds into another powerful anthem with beautiful echoes of The Cocteau Twins. It could see her break into the Top 20 for the first time." Dave Brecheisen of PopMatters felt that the acoustic version of "Ironic", was much worse than the original version. The single won the Juno Award for Single of the Year at the 1997 ceremony, and in the same year it was nominated for a Grammy Award, in the category of Record of the Year.

Chart performance
In Canada, "Ironic" debuted on the RPM Singles Chart at number 95 on the issue dated January 8, 1996. Twelve weeks later the track topped the chart, on April 1, 1996, staying there for six weeks, being replaced by "Closer to Free" by American band BoDeans. Spending twenty-nine weeks within the top 100, it was last seen on July 22, 1996, at number 81. It spent 14 weeks in the Top 10 and was the number two song of 1996, behind Morissette's own "You Learn" at number one.  On other RPM charts, the single topped the Alternative Rock Chart for a single week, spending 11 weeks in the Top 10, finishing 1996 as the number five song for the year on that chart.  It reached number six on the Adult Contemporary Chart.

In the U.S., the track debuted at number 11 on the Billboard Hot 100 following its commercial release, becoming the highest debut on the issue ending March 16, 1996. The single eventually reached its peak position, at number four, on April 13, 1996. "Ironic" is currently Morissette's highest-charting hit on the Hot 100 chart. On other US charts, the single became her third number-one hit on the Billboard Modern Rock Tracks, where it stayed for three weeks. The song topped the Mainstream Top 40 (Pop Songs) chart, reached number two on the Hot 100 Airplay chart (which includes both pop and rhythmic/crossover radio stations), reached number five on Adult Top 40 chart and peaked at number 28 of the Adult Contemporary chart.

In Australia, the song debuted at number 40 on the ARIA Singles Chart. In its eighth week, it peaked at number three on May 12, 1996, where it stayed for two weeks. It was last appeared on the chart on July 21, 1996, at number 37. To date, "Ironic" is her best charting song on the country. In New Zealand, where the song was released as a double A-side with "You Oughta Know", it debuted at number 13 on April 21, 1996, peaked at number three on May 19, and made its last appearance on the chart at number 36 on June 30, staying at total of 11 weeks in the top 50. Like in Australia, "Ironic" became Morissette's highest-peaking single in New Zealand, but only at the time; "Thank U" and "Hands Clean" would chart higher in 1998 and 2002, respectively.

The song was generally well-received throughout Europe. In the United Kingdom "Ironic" debuted and peaked at number 11, on April 20, 1996. It left the chart eight weeks later, at number 67. In the Norwegian Singles Charts, it debuted at number 18, rising to number 17 the next week. It rose to number five on its third week, and later peaked at number four, staying there for five weeks. It later dropped one place, and remained there for another two weeks. "Ironic" kept within the chart for seventeen weeks. In Belgium, it reached sixth place on the Ultratop 50 (Flanders region), and ninth place on the Ultratop 50 (Wallonia zone).

Promotion

Music video

The music video for "Ironic" was directed by Stéphane Sednaoui and released on January 23, 1996. In the beginning of the video, Morissette is at a gas station, walking to her automobile (1978 Lincoln Continental Mark V) with a cup of coffee in her hand. Then, she drives her car through a winter landscape, and she begins to sing the song's first verse. When it comes to the chorus, a second Morissette comes in. She is in a green sweater and sits in the backseat on the passenger side. When the first chorus ends, a third Morissette comes in, and she is in a yellow sweater with braided hair, also in the backseat, but on the driver's side. Along the way, the yellow Morissette is singing and eating at the same time, and when it comes to the second verse, a fourth and last Morissette comes in, she is in a red sweater sitting in the front passenger seat. During the second chorus, she climbs out of the window when they are still driving and almost gets knocked out by a bridge, but still manages a smile after doing so. The camera comes back to the driving Morissette, after the breakdown, and she takes off her hat, tosses it into the back seat, and becomes as loud as the other three while singing the song. When Morissette sings the outro, she is still driving through the winter landscape, and suddenly the car breaks down (possibly having run out of gas, which may be "ironic" in itself since the video started with her at a gas station). Morissette (as the driver) gets out of the car, and all her "passengers" have disappeared.

In an interview for Vogue in 2015, Morissette revealed that her clothes in the video reflected the personalities of each character. The driver in a red knit beanie was the one in control, "the responsible one". The spunky character, who Morissette refers to as the “quirkster,” wears a yellow sweater with a crown of long swaying braids. Morissette liked the braids so much that she would often wear them on stage. The passenger-seat girl wearing a deep red sweater and pajama-type pants was "the romantic—wistful and thoughtful and also the risk-taker". As for the girl head-banging in the backseat in green sweater, Morissette said; "The girl in green feels the most like the 'whole me'. The green sweater girl—fun and frolic-y. [She] gets into trouble—she's the girl you want with you when you are heading to a water park."

Blaine Allan noted in the book Television: Critical Methods and Applications (2002) how Morissette interacts with the watcher. He commented that unlike Britney Spears' "Lucky" music video, where Spears plays dual role of a girl named "Lucky" and her fan, and both appear together in some scenes helped by visual effects, "Ironic" does not utilize them, using solely editing, giving the sense that all the Morissettes interact with each other. Journalist Carol Vernallis also found that Morissette's "chitchat" way of singing the song creates an intimate connection with the viewer. She mentioned the video in her book Experiencing Music Video: Aesthetics and Cultural Context (2004), where she studied how the audience may pay attention to the lyrics of the song in a music video. Vernallis added that "Ironic" music video functions as a limited example of how the meaning of a song's lyrics become "inaccessible" when they are videotaped and televised.

Charles Aaron from Spin called "Ironic" music video "neat". The video was nominated for six MTV Video Music Awards in 1996: "Video of the Year", "Best Direction in a Video", "Viewer's Choice", "Best Female Video", "Best New Artist in a Video" and "Best Editing", winning the last three. It was nominated in 1997 for the Grammy Award for Best Short Form Music Video. Also, it was listed number eighteen at VH1's 100 Greatest Videos.

In late 1996, a parody version of the video was released featuring a 6-year-old Canadian girl named Allison Rheaume, who mimics Morissette's actions and wardrobe while lip syncing to the original song. At the end, her father notices her in the car sitting in the driveway and tells her to stop fooling around. This version of the video, directed by David Rheaume, was played on MTV and was included on Morissette's CD/DVD The Collection (2005).

Also in late 1996, the video was spoofed by Jimmy The Cab Driver during a commercial on MTV. Inglewood, CA rapper DBA Flip parodied the video for his 1996 single "It's Friday Night (Just Got Paid)". At the end of the video, Flip's car runs out of gas as he rolls up on an Alanis Morissette lookalike carrying a gas can and wearing one of the jackets from the "You Learn" video.

Canadian band Rusty parodied "Ironic" on the version 2 of the music video for their 1997 single "Empty Cell".

"Weird Al" Yankovic produced a parody version of the video in 2003 for his television comedy series Al TV, in which he takes the place of the fourth version of Morissette in the front passenger seat.

In 2018, Toronto R&B singer Ramriddlz paid tribute to "Ironic" on the music video for his single "Worst Love".

Live performances
The single was added in the set list for Morissette's concert tour, Jagged Little Pill World Tour (1995). The song was added to the tour's video album Jagged Little Pill Live (1997). Since then, "Ironic" has been included in her albums MTV Unplugged (1999), Feast on Scraps (2002), Live in the Navajo Nation (2002), and The Collection, as well as 1997 Grammys and the MTV Unplugged compilation albums.

With "Ironic", Morissette denoted her support for same-sex marriage. In March 2004, Morissette amended a lyric at the fifteenth annual GLAAD Media Awards: "It's meeting the man of my dreams /And then meeting his beautiful husband". She commented to USA Today that her support about same-sex unions "goes a step further than clever lyrics." She remarked that "[her] fantasy would now be to marry some of [her] gay couple friends." Later in June 2004, she said to VH1: "I don't have any gay-couple friends who are formally engaged, but I would be honored to support the gay community in that way ... I did it as a sort of spontaneous thing at a radio station about a month ago with a couple, and my heart was so with them." Morissette recorded an acoustic version of the song with the changed lyric for her iTunes Originals release, in 2004. Another acoustic version was recorded for the album Jagged Little Pill Acoustic, as well for the compilation album Cities 97 Sampler, Volume 16 (2004). Morissette also performed the song with Avril Lavigne at the House of Blues in 2005.

Covers and use in media
In 2003, Ji-In Cho covered the song for the German version of the Fame Academy talent show, which became a success in the German charts. "Ironic" was covered in 2007 by Mexican duet Jesse & Joy for their album Esta Es Mi Vida Sesiones, and the pop punk band Four Year Strong for their 90s cover album Explains It All (2009).

In the 1996 novel Naïve. Super by Norwegian author Erlend Loe, the protagonist watches the video for the song on television and dreams about "meeting an Alanis-girl and living in a house together with her". In the Jay and Silent Bob comic Chasing Dogma (1998), the character Tricia Jones is singing "Ironic" before Jay steps into the shower. The music of the song was featured in the romantic comedy film I Could Never Be Your Woman (2007), where Saoirse Ronan, as Izzie Mensforth, sings an altered version of the lyrics in a talent show. It also made a predominant appearance as the opener to 2013 comedy film The Internship, starring Owen Wilson and Vince Vaughn, as they sing along to it.

In 2015, Morissette appeared on The Late Late Show with James Corden and sang a version of the song with new lyrics "updated" for the technology era, and an homage to the linguistics of the original mentioned above.

Track listing

CD single, cassette
 "Ironic"  – 3:49
 "You Oughta Know" (acoustic/live from the Grammy Awards)  – 3:48
 "Mary Jane" (live)  – 5:52
 "All I Really Want" (live)  – 5:22

Special edition maxi single
 "Ironic" (album version)  – 3:48
 "Forgiven" (live)  – 6:09
 "Not the Doctor" (live)  – 6:05
 "Wake Up" (live)  – 5:05

Personnel
Credits adapted from "Ironic" CD single:
 Alanis Morissette – vocals, producer, writer
 Glen Ballard – producer, guitar, writer
 Lance Morrison – bass guitar
 Rob Ladd – drums and percussion
 Michael Thompson – organ
 Basil Fung – guitar
 Chris Fogel – mixing

Charts

Weekly charts

Year-end charts

All-time charts

Certifications

Release history

See also
 List of Mainstream Top 40 number-one hits of 1996 (U.S.)
 List of RPM number-one singles of 1996 (Canada)
 List of RPM Rock/Alternative number-one singles (Canada)
 Number one modern rock hits of 1996

References

External links

 
 Boon, Andrew, "The Search for Irony: a textual analysis of the lyrics of Ironic by Alanis Morissette", The Reading Matrix, 5: 129–142 (2005).
 How we learned to love Alanis Morissette's 'irony' – discussion of the definition of "irony" which is hotly disputed in this song

1990s ballads
1996 singles
1996 songs
Alanis Morissette songs
Irony
Juno Award for Single of the Year singles
Maverick Records singles
MTV Video Music Award for Best Female Video
Music videos directed by Stéphane Sednaoui
Rock ballads
RPM Top Singles number-one singles
Songs based on actual events
Songs about death
Songs about old age
Songs written by Alanis Morissette
Songs written by Glen Ballard
Warner Records singles